Arlington Heights is a neighborhood in Portland of grand houses and some of the city's most renowned parks, such as the Japanese Garden.

Schools
Three schools serve the neighborhood: Ainsworth Elementary School, West Sylvan Middle School, and Lincoln High School.

Parks 

Hoyt Arboretum
Japanese Garden
Vietnam Veterans of Oregon Memorial
Washington Park
International Rose Test Garden

References

External links 
Crime

Neighborhoods in Portland, Oregon